When Morning Comes is a Canadian-Jamaican drama film, directed by Kelly Fyffe-Marshall and released in 2022. The film centres on Jamal (Djamari Roberts), a young boy in Jamaica who is processing his uncertain feelings about his mother Neesha's (Shaquana Wilson) decision to send him to live in Canada with his grandmother following his father's death.

In May 2022, following his win of the Toronto Film Critics Association's Clyde Gilmour Award, filmmaker David Cronenberg announced that he had selected Fyffe-Marshall as the recipient of the "pay it forward" grant, awarding Fyffe-Marshall $50,000 in post-production services toward the film.

The film premiered in the Discovery program at the 2022 Toronto International Film Festival on September 12, 2022.

Critical response
Courtney Small of That Shelf praised the film, writing that "anchored by strong performances by Roberts and Wilson, stunning cinematography from long time collaborator Jordan Oram, and an amazing soundtrack, there is much to engulf oneself here. Fyffe-Marshall’s constructs a poetically beautiful and heartfelt love letter to Jamaica and sense of community it fosters. When Morning Comes is a mesmerizing work that both delivers on the promise Fyffe-Marshall displayed in her short films and solidifies her as one of the most exciting voices in cinema."

Awards
The film was shortlisted for the Directors Guild of Canada's 2022 Jean-Marc Vallée DGC Discovery Award.

References

External links

2022 films
2022 drama films
Canadian drama films
Jamaican drama films
Films directed by Kelly Fyffe-Marshall
Films set in Jamaica
2022 directorial debut films
2020s Canadian films